The 1972 Clean Air Classic was a combined men's and women's tennis tournament that took place at the Seventh Regiment Armory in New York in the United States. It was sanctioned by the Eastern Lawn Tennis Association  but was not part of the official Men's Grand Prix or Women's Tennis Circuit. It was the third edition of the event and was held from December 7 through December 10, 1972. The tournament utilized a distinct scoring system with points instead of the common 0-15-30-40 and a game was won by the first player to reach four points. The singles titles were won by Charlie Pasarell and Virginia Wade.

Finals

Men's singles
 Charlie Pasarell defeated  Pancho Gonzales 4–6, 6–2, 6–2

Men's doubles
 Clark Graebner /  Frew McMillan defeated  Brian Gottfried /  Dick Stockton 6–3, 6–2

Women's singles
 Virginia Wade defeated  Rosie Casals 6–3, 6–3

References

Clean Air Classic
Clean Air Classic
Clean Air Classic